Robert Scales may refer to:
 Robert H. Scales (born 1944), United States Army general
 Robert W. Scales (1926–2000), civic leader and politician in Murfreesboro, Tennessee
 Robert Scales, 1st Baron Scales (died 1304), Knight Templar and loyal supporter of Edward I
 Robert Scales, 2nd Baron Scales (died 1324)
 Robert Scales, 3rd Baron Scales (died 1369)
 Robert Scales, 5th Baron Scales (1372–1402)
 Robert Scales, 6th Baron Scales (c. 1395–1418) 
 Bobby Scales (born 1977), American baseball player